Diane Wakoski (born August 3, 1937) is an American poet. Wakoski is primarily associated with the deep image poets, as well as the confessional and Beat poets of the 1960s. She received considerable attention in the 1980s for controversial comments linking New Formalism with Reaganism.

Life and work 
Wakoski was born in Whittier, California. She studied at the University of California, Berkeley where she graduated in 1960 with a Bachelor of Arts degree. During her time at this university she participated in Thom Gunn's poetry workshops. It was there that she first read many of the modernist poets who would influence her writing style. Her early writings were considered part of the deep image movement that also included the works of Jerome Rothenberg, Robert Kelly, and Clayton Eshleman, among others. She also cites William Carlos Williams, Allen Ginsberg and Charles Bukowski as influences. 
Her poetry career began in New York City, where she moved with La Monte Young in 1960. She remained a resident of New York City until 1973.
Her later work is more personal and conversational in the Williams mode. Wakoski is married to the photographer Robert Turney, and is University Distinguished Professor Emeritus at Michigan State University in East Lansing, Michigan.

Wakoski's literary works have been recognized and highlighted at Michigan State University in their Michigan Writers Series.

Her work has been published in more than twenty collections and many slim volumes of poetry.  Her selected poems, Emerald Ice, won the William Carlos Williams Prize from the Poetry Society of America in 1989. She is best known for a series of poems collectively known as "The Motorcycle Betrayal Poems."  Many of her books have been published in fine editions by Black Sparrow Press.

Awards
 William Carlos Williams Award for her book Emerald Ice.
 Guggenheim Foundation grant
 National Endowment for the Arts grant
 Fulbright Grant
 Pansy Award from The Society of Western Flowers

Bibliography

Poetry

Collections
 

 

 
 

Smudging. Black Sparrow Press. 1972.
Greed: Parts 8, 9, & 11. Black Sparrow Press. 1973.

List of poems

Non-fiction

References

External links

 Diane Wakoski at The Academy of American Poets 
 RED BANDANNA: a poem
David Smith Collection of Diane Wakoski Materials MSS 687. Special Collections & Archives, UC San Diego Library.

|archivedate

1937 births
Living people
Modernist women writers
Poets from California
University of California, Berkeley alumni
Michigan State University faculty
People from La Habra, California
Writers from Whittier, California
American people of Polish descent
American women poets
American women essayists
20th-century American poets
20th-century American women writers
21st-century American poets
21st-century American women writers
20th-century American essayists
21st-century American essayists
American women academics